Glee is an American musical comedy-drama television series produced by Fox. It focuses on the glee club New Directions, at the fictional William McKinley High School in Lima, Ohio. The show was created by Ryan Murphy, Brad Falchuk and Ian Brennan, and features many cover versions of songs sung on-screen by the characters. Murphy is responsible for selecting all of the songs used, and strives to maintain a balance between show tunes and chart hits, as he wants there to be "something for everybody in every episode." Once Murphy selects a song, rights are cleared with its publishers by music supervisor P.J. Bloom, and music producer Adam Anders rearranges it for the Glee cast. Numbers are pre-recorded by the cast, while choreographer Zach Woodlee constructs the accompanying dance moves, which are then taught to the cast and filmed. Studio recordings of tracks are then made. The process begins six to eight weeks before each episode is filmed, and can end as late as the day before filming begins. For the first thirteen episodes of Glee first season, the show averaged five songs per episode, which increased to eight songs for the final nine episodes. In season two, Glee averaged six songs per episode. The list below contains all 138 musical performances of the second season, with each performance delivering an individual song or a mashup of two or more songs in a single performance.

Songs featured on the show are available for digital download through the iTunes Store up to two weeks before new episodes air, and through other digital outlets and mobile carriers a week later. The season has featured three tribute episodes: "Britney/Brittany", showcasing songs by Britney Spears; "The Rocky Horror Glee Show", an episode featuring songs from The Rocky Horror Show;, and "Rumours", the first episode to pay tribute to an album, Fleetwood Mac's Rumours. Another episode in the season featured original songs. Glee: The Music, The Rocky Horror Glee Show, an extended play (EP) with songs from the fifth episode, was released October 19, 2010. Two soundtrack albums, Glee: The Music, The Christmas Album and Glee: The Music, Volume 4, were both released in November 2010. The series' sixth soundtrack album, Glee: The Music, Volume 5, was released in March 2011, and its seventh, Glee: The Music Presents the Warblers, saw its release the following month. An eighth, Glee: The Music, Volume 6, was released on May 23, 2011.

Performers
The majority of songs are performed by New Directions, which is composed of Artie Abrams (Kevin McHale), Rachel Berry (Lea Michele), Mike Chang (Harry Shum, Jr.), Tina Cohen-Chang (Jenna Ushkowitz), Sam Evans (Chord Overstreet), Quinn Fabray (Dianna Agron), Finn Hudson (Cory Monteith), Kurt Hummel (Chris Colfer), Mercedes Jones (Amber Riley), Santana Lopez (Naya Rivera), Brittany S. Pierce (Heather Morris) and Noah Puckerman (Mark Salling), plus club director Will Schuester (Matthew Morrison). At the end of "Furt", however, Kurt enrolls in Dalton Academy and joins the Warblers; McKinley high student Lauren Zizes (Ashley Fink) takes his place, and remains in New Directions even after Kurt returns to McKinley in "Born This Way". During season two, New Directions is joined by transfer student and athlete Sam Evans (Chord Overstreet), and McKinley High foreign exchange student Sunshine Corazon (Charice) tries out for New Directions, but although she is accepted, transfers instead to Carmel High and joins its glee club, Vocal Adrenaline. Jayma Mays performs as school guidance counselor Emma Pillsbury, and guest stars John Stamos, Dot-Marie Jones and Kristin Chenoweth perform as dentist Carl Howell, football coach Shannon Beiste and April Rhodes, respectively. Darren Criss appears as Blaine Anderson, lead singer of rival glee club the Dalton Academy Warblers, and Gwyneth Paltrow guest-stars and performs as Holly Holliday, a substitute teacher. Cheerleading coach Sue Sylvester (Jane Lynch) performs with her mother Doris (Carol Burnett) and once with New Directions. As in the first season, Lynch and Mays are credits with vocals on some soundtrack albums despite not being featured on screen for any of the songs.

Songs included on Glee: The Music, The Rocky Horror Glee Show feature additional vocals by non-cast members Adam Anders, Nikki Anders, Kamari Copeland, Tim Davis, Missi Hale, Tobias Kampe-Flygare, Storm Lee, David Loucks, and Windy Wagner. These performers reappear on Glee: The Music, Volume 4, and are joined by Kala Balch, Colin Benward, Ravaughn Brown, Jon Hall, Samantha Jade, Jeanette Olsson, Zac Poor, Drew Ryan Scott, and Onitsha Shaw. All but Benward, Jade, Kampe-Flygare, Olsson and Poor feature on Glee: The Music, Volume 5, which also includes vocals by Alex Anders. Songs performed by the Dalton Academy Warblers contain vocals by the Beelzebubs, an a cappella group from Tufts University. The members providing these background vocals consist of Sam Cantor, Conor Flynn, Michael Grant, John Kwon, Cailin Mackenzie, Kent McCann, Eric Morrissey, Evan Powell, Penn Rosen, Eli Seidman, and Jack Thomas. Only one of the thirteen songs on Glee: The Music Presents the Warblers did not feature the Beelzebubs: "Blackbird", which was sung by Chris Colfer with other backing vocalists; the album featured additional vocals by Adam Anders, Nikki Anders, Shoshana Bean, Davis, Lee, Loucks, Olsson, Shaw and Wagner. These performers, with the exception of Bean, plus Alex Anders, Bach, Brown, Copeland and Scott, are featured on Glee: The Music, Volume 6. While recurring cast members Shum, Jr. and Fink perform in the group numbers on screen, neither is credited with performing vocally on any soundtrack albums.

Songs

See also
 List of songs in Glee (season 1)
 List of songs in Glee (season 3)
 List of songs in Glee (season 4)
 List of songs in Glee (season 5)
 List of songs in Glee (season 6)
 Glee albums discography

Notes

References

General
 
 
Glee: The Music, The Rocky Horror Glee Show track listing – 
Glee: The Music, The Christmas Album track listing – 
Glee: The Music, Volume 4 track listing – 
Glee: The Music, Volume 5 track listing – 
Glee: The Music, Volume 5 UK track listing – 
Glee: The Music Presents the Warblers track listing – 
Glee: The Music, Volume 6 track listing – 

Specific

Glee